The Super3 Series (formerly the Kumho Tyres Super3 Series, Kumho Tyres Australian V8 Touring Car Series and V8 Touring Car National Series) is an Australian motor racing competition for touring cars. In 2019 it became the official third tier series for Supercars competitors, while the series itself remains independently owned and managed from Supercars. The cars must be deregistered cars from official Supercar teams and series, this is mainly as a preventive measure against a team building a brand new car to suit the regulations. The series is currently known by the commercial identity of the Dunlop Super3 Series.

History
The series came into existence as an acknowledgement that there are many old V8 Supercars no longer eligible or competitive in the second-tier Dunlop V8 Supercar Series and, other than as overweight and uncompetitive Sports Sedans, had nowhere else to race. The series has also attracted competitors from the now defunct Australian Touring Car Challenge which had run on the now collapsed Australian Motor Racing Championships program.

The inaugural series was held in 2008 as a completely new category, running on the Shannons Nationals Motor Racing Championships schedule. The series struggled to find a grid in its opening year, with the low point coming in the second round at Eastern Creek where just three cars were entered. The series has since swollen with the deregistration of the Ford AU Falcon and Holden VX Commodore from the Fujitsu V8 Supercar Series, with a number of fresh cars and teams stepping straight out of the second-tier series.

Chris Smerdon, a former V8 Supercar driver, was the inaugural series champion, dominating the 2008 series in an ex-Stone Brothers Racing Ford AU Falcon. The 2009 series saw former Fujitsu Series drivers Adam Wallis and Terry Wyhoon battle with Smerdon for the crown, with Wallis coming out on top over Wyhoon and Smerdon. Another former Fujitsu Series driver, Tony Evangelou, won the 2010 series, being the only driver to compete in all five rounds. Wyhoon won the series in 2011 after a close battle with Smerdon and Scott Loadsman.

In 2019, the series was rebranded to Super3.

In 2020, only two rounds of the series were completed - therefore no champion was awarded.

In 2021 the Super3 Series sat to join alongside the Dunlop Super2 Series for the first time as a class.

Format
Each weekend consist of two races, the first usually held on Saturday and the second on Sunday. To score points, the driver must complete at least 75% of the race distance and must cross the finish line at the completion of the race. At least 50% of the planned race distance must be completed for the result to be valid and championship points awarded.

Series winners

References

External links 

Supercars Championship